The Childhood of a Leader is a 2015 historical drama film, co-written, co-produced and directed by Brady Corbet, and is Corbet's feature film directorial debut. It is loosely based on Jean-Paul Sartre's short story The Childhood of a Leader, published in 1939 in a collection entitled The Wall. Corbet co-wrote the screenplay with his wife Mona Fastvold, and filmed both an English- and a French-language version.

The film chronicles the childhood of a fascist leader in the period immediately following World War I. Production began in early 2015, in Budapest, (Hungary). The film had its world premiere in-competition (Horizon section) at the 72nd Venice International Film Festival on 5 September 2015 and won two awards at the festival, Best Debut film and Best Director.

Plot
In 1919, an American boy has temporarily retreated to the French countryside with his father, an American diplomat who is there to help negotiate the Treaty of Versailles, and his mother, who is German born. After rehearsing for a church pageant the boy throws rocks at the other children and their parents and then runs into the woods. When he returns he sees his father who has been drinking with family friend Charles Marker. The boy is forced to apologize to the townspeople and though he is unrepentant he is forgiven.

Though his mother is fluent in French the boy has been forbidden from speaking anything but English with his mother. As they are living in France however, the mother is permitted to hire a tutor, Ada, to teach the boy French. The boy later sees Ada alone with his father, which his father claims was because he was paying her. Afterwards, during one of their lessons the boy grabs Ada's breast. Though she is upset by the encounter Ada does not mention it to his mother.

The father, along with several trusted aides, spends some time in secret meetings at the house, no longer having faith in the negotiations. One of the aides, seeing the boy, mistakes him for a girl, which causes him to strip off his clothes and lock himself in his room for several days. His mother intends to starve him out but he is secretly fed by Mona, the housekeeper. When the mother discovers this she fires Mona. Mona vows to destroy the mother and her family.

The boy spends several days locked in his room learning French. Afterwards he recites a text in front of his mother and Ada and then asks his mother to dismiss Ada so he can continue his studies alone. The father returns to find the mother with Charles Marker. Upon seeing that his son is still disrobed he promises to lash him which results in a physical altercation in which he injures the boy's arm.

In celebration of the signed treaty, the family throws a dinner party for some close intimates. During the dinner the father asks the mother to lead the group in prayer; she in turn asks the boy to do so. Instead he announces that he doesn't believe in prayer anymore. When the mother tries to take him  to his room he strikes her several times in the temple with a rock. When the father attempts to apprehend him, the boy runs off revealing that he was faking his arm injury. In the process of running he trips and injures himself. He is approached by Charles Marker reassuring him that he is alright.

Several decades later the boy, Prescott, is now an adult and the military leader of a fascist state. Crowds of adoring fans greet him. He has grown to look like his biological father, Charles Marker.

Cast
Bérénice Bejo as The Mother
Liam Cunningham as The Father
Stacy Martin as Ada
Robert Pattinson as Charles Marker / adult Prescott
Tom Sweet as Prescott, The Boy
Yolande Moreau as Mona
Jacques Boudet as The Priest
Michel Subor
Sophie Curtis
Patrick McCullough
Michael Epp as Mr. Advisor
Roderick Hill as Older American Gentleman

Production

Development
Brady Corbet began writing the script of the film ten years before on his own but later put it down as he considered it "too big" for a debut film. He later picked it up again after support from his partner Mona Fastvold. On 1 April 2013, it was announced that Corbet was set to make his feature film directorial debut with a France-set World War I film, based on the script he co-wrote with Mona Fastvold. Corbet would produce along with French producers Antoine de Clermont-Tonnerre and Chris Coen, as well as Istvan Major. Film Producer Helena Danielsson of Hepp Film also came on board to get the film additional financing.

In 2015, Corbet said that the script of the film was inspired by Robert Bresson's Mouchette, Maurice Pialat's Under the Sun of Satan, Ermanno Olmi's The Tree of Wooden Clogs, Carl Theodor Dreyer's Day of Wrath and Stanley Kubrick's Barry Lyndon.

Casting
On 10 December 2013, it was announced that Juliette Binoche, Tim Roth and Robert Pattinson had joined the cast of the film. In August 2014, it was announced that both Binoche and Roth had left the project. Roth dropped due to scheduling conflict while Binoche cited the reason that it was "too dark". The same month Binoche and Roth were replaced by Bérénice Bejo and Liam Cunningham.

Corbet talking about the casting and characters in the film said that I have intentionally not revealed the identity of (the boy who will become leader) character. And it's a funny thing because it's not for the reasons that people think. One thing I will happily tell everybody is that the character is not Hitler [laughs]. And the character is not Mussolini. It's someone else. And there's the dramatic event where you learn who this person is and that's something I want to save for people. Robert Pattinson is not playing Hitler as you now know [laughs]. I'll go on the record saying that.

Corbet held auditions for the casting of the role of Prescott, describing it as "(we) held simple auditions (one page of text) for the boys reading for the main role. Des Hamilton and his great team found Tom Sweet and brought him in. Tom was everything we had envisioned and more. He is the film’s greatest triumph."

Pre-production
Production was originally slated to start from November 2014 but later moved to January 2015. Pattinson describing the film said that "It's about the youth of a future dictator in the Thirties, like an amalgamation of Hitler, Mussolini and some others." Bejo talking about her character in the film said that "(I'm playing) the character of a mother whose son is very particular, a little awkward and weird. Over the scenes you're realizing that it is not a normal guy, he'll become a monster or something. And it is about the relationship with the mother and father."

Filming
Principal photography began from 30 January 2015 in Budapest and continued till 1 March 2015. On 3 February 2015, filming took place at Buda Castle and Hungarian National Gallery.

Music

Singer-songwriter, composer and record producer Scott Walker composed the score of the film. The soundtrack album was released by 4AD on 19 August 2016. The Film served as closing film at 2016 International Film Festival Rotterdam, where the score of the film was performed live during the screening of the film.

Walker's score received acclaim, as Gary Goldstein of LA Times said that it "impresses and fascinates", Donald Clarke of Irish Times called it "MVP" of the film, while Peter Bradshaw of The Guardian described it as an "almost Herrmann-esque orchestral score from Scott Walker. The touch of suppressed psychopathic rage comes from his music."

Promotion and marketing
On 13 February 2015, Producer Chris Coen released the first image featuring Robert Pattinson, Bérénice Bejo and Liam Cunningham in their costumes. Another still featuring Pattinson, Bejo and Cunningham was released on 8 April 2015. Exclusive footage from the film screened at Marché du Film of 2015 Cannes Film Festival. Two clips from the film were released on 4 September 2015. On 25 October 2015, it was screened at Jacob Burns Film Center.

Release
The film released in USA on 22 July 2016, in theatres and on VOD simultaneously by IFC Films. Originally it was to be released by Metrodome Distribution in UK but few days before its release the company filed for bankruptcy, after which Soda Pictures released it in UK on 19 August 2016.

Reception
The film received positive reviews from critics, with emphasis on Corbet's screenplay and  direction, the performances of the cast, Scott Walker's music and Lol Crawley's cinematography. Review aggregator Rotten Tomatoes reports that 90% of 66 critics have given the film a positive review, with a rating average of 7.40/10. The site's critical consensus reads, "The Childhood of a Leader mirrors the rise of fascism in post-WWI Europe with a well-acted, confidently crafted look at one young man's unsettling coming of age." Metacritic gives the film a score of 68 based on reviews from 18 critics, indicating "generally favorable reviews".

David Ehrlich in his review for Indiewire said, "With his unusually accomplished directorial debut, Corbet delivers a strange and startling film that reflects the unique trajectory of his career, as well as the influence of the iconoclastic directors with whom he's already worked." Lee Marshall of Screen International wrote a positive review for the film, saying, "The Childhood of a Leader is as relentlessly sombre and compelling as the film’s remarkable, full-volume orchestral soundtrack" and compared it with Michael Haneke's work, saying, "though it shares something of Haneke's dispassionate view of human nature, The Childhood of a Leader is in no way derivative. Dominated by dread, veering into art horror at points, this compulsively dark story takes no prisoners." Tommaso Tocci of The Film Stage called it "a huge psychological and tonal balancing act that could crumble at each turn, and yet never does." Guy Lodge of Variety called it "a overweening, maddening but not inconsiderable directorial debut for actor Brady Corbet, which plays as something of a straight-faced parody of a well-upholstered historical biopic." In his review for Eye For Film, Damon Wise said, "It sounds like a slow-paced chamber piece, and some scenes are, but a brilliant framing device involving a stunning orchestral score by, of all people, Scott Walker gives the film a nerve-wracking urgency." John Bleasdale of Cine Vu gave it five out five stars by saying that "(it) is a dark, enigmatic piece of work that hovers between visionary greatness and petty domestic triviality. Corbet's inaugural stint behind the camera marks a stunning debut and the finest film at Venice thus far."

In contrast, Deborah Young in her review for The Hollywood Reporter said, "There is actually a lot of imagination at work in the film, though frustratingly it rarely comes together in an emotionally meaningful way."

Accolades

References

External links
 
 
 

2015 films
2010s English-language films
2010s French-language films
2010s historical drama films
British historical drama films
Films set in 1919
Films shot in Budapest
Films set in Paris
Films based on short fiction
British World War I films
French historical drama films
Films scored by Scott Walker (singer)
Films based on British novels
2015 directorial debut films
IFC Films films
2015 multilingual films
British multilingual films
French multilingual films
French World War I films
2010s British films
2010s French films